Helle Sørensen (born 22 May 1963) is a Danish former cyclist. She competed in the women's road race event at the 1984 Summer Olympics.

References

External links
 

1963 births
Living people
People from Ringsted
Danish female cyclists
Olympic cyclists of Denmark
Cyclists at the 1984 Summer Olympics
Sportspeople from Region Zealand
20th-century Danish women